The deputy premier of Queensland is a role in the Government of Queensland assigned to a responsible Minister in the Australian state of Queensland. It has second ranking behind the premier of Queensland in Cabinet, and its holder serves as acting premier during absence or incapacity of the premier. The deputy premier may either be appointed by the premier during the cabinet formation process, or may be elected by caucus; during periods of Coalition government, the leader of the junior coalition partner is usually automatically selected for the role. Due to the contingent role of the deputy premier, they almost without exception always have additional ministerial portfolios.

Until December 1974, although the role carried the same responsibilities (especially during the absence of the premier) it was never formally recognised or titled as such; the first reference in Hansard to a deputy premier was during the Forgan Smith Ministry in 1936, but the term was in common use in newspapers from as early as 1892, when a minister in the First Griffith Ministry was criticised for his performance in the role.

List of deputy premiers of Queensland

Notes

See also
Government of Queensland
Politics of Queensland
Premier of Queensland

Queensland
 
Queensland-related lists